Petróleo Brasileiro S.A., better known by the portmanteau Petrobras, is a state-owned Brazilian multinational corporation in the petroleum industry headquartered in Rio de Janeiro, Brazil. The company's name translates to Brazilian Petroleum Corporation — Petrobras.

The company was ranked #181 in the most recent Fortune Global 500 list. In the 2020 Forbes Global 2000, Petrobras was ranked as the 65th-largest public company in the world.'

History

Petrobras was created in 1953 under the government of Brazilian president Getúlio Vargas with the slogan "The Oil is Ours" (Portuguese: "O petróleo é nosso"). It was given a legal monopoly in Brazil. In 1953, Brazil produced only 2,700 barrels of oil per day. In 1961, the company's REDUC refinery began operations near Rio de Janeiro, and in 1963, its Cenpes research center opened in Rio de Janeiro; it remains one of the world's largest centers dedicated to energy research. In 1968, the company established Petrobras Quimica S.A ("Petroquisa"), a subsidiary focused on petrochemicals and the conversion of naphtha into ethene.

Petrobras had begun processing oil shale in 1953, developing the Petrosix technology for extracting oil from oil shale. It began using an industrial-size retort to process shale in the 1990s. In 2006, Petrobras said that their industrial retort could process 260 tonnes/hour of oil shale.

In 1994, Petrobras put the Petrobras 36, the world's largest oil platform, into service. It sank after an explosion in 2001 and was a complete loss. In 1997, the government approved Law N.9.478, which broke Petrobras's monopoly and allowed competition in Brazil's oilfields, and also created the national petroleum agency Agência Nacional do Petróleo, (ANP) responsible for the regulation and supervision of the petroleum industry, and the National Council of Energy Policies, a public agency responsible for developing public energy policy. In 1999, the National Petroleum Agency signed agreements with other companies, ending the company's monopoly.

In 2005, Petrobras announced a joint venture with Nippon Alcohol Hanbai KK to sell Brazilian ethanol to Japan, called Brazil-Japan Ethanol. On 21 April 2006, the company started production on the P-50 oil platform in the Albacora East field at Campos Basin, which made Brazil self-sufficient in oil production. By November 2015, the company had accumulated $128 billion in debt, 84% of it denominated in foreign currencies.

Operations

Business areas
The company operates in six business areas, listed in order of revenue:
 Refining, transportation and marketing – refining, logistics, transportation, trading operations, oil products and crude oil exports and imports and petrochemical investments in Brazil
 Exploration and production – crude oil, natural gas liquids (NGL) and natural gas exploration, development and production in Brazil
 Distribution – distribution of oil products, ethanol, biodiesel and natural gas to wholesalers and through the Petrobras Distribuidora S.A. retail network in Brazil
 Gas and power – transportation and trading of natural gas and LNG, and generation and trading of electric power, and the fertilizer business
 International – exploration and production of oil and gas, refining, transportation and marketing, distribution and gas and power operations outside of Brazil
 Biofuels – production of biodiesel and its co-products and ethanol-related activities such as equity investments, production and trading of ethanol, sugar and the excess electricity generated from sugarcane bagasse

Production and reserves
Petrobras controls significant oil and energy assets in 16 countries in Africa, North America, South America, Europe, and Asia.

However, Brazil represented 92% of Petrobras' worldwide production in 2014 and accounted for 97% of Petrobras' worldwide reserves on 31 December 2014, 
Of these, 62.7% were located in the offshore Campos Basin. The largest growth prospect for the company is the Tupi oil field in the Santos Basin.

International investments

Reserves held outside of Brazil accounted for 8.4% of production in 2014. The majority of these reserves are in South America; the company has assets in Bolivia and Colombia.

Petrobras owns refineries in Texas (100,000 barrels per day of throughput). The company also owns exploration blocks in the Gulf of Mexico.

Refineries
North Region
 REMAN – Refinaria Isaac Sabbá - Manaus (Amazonas) – 46 000 bpd

Northeast Region 
 RNEST – Abreu e Lima Refinery – Suape (Pernambuco) – 230.000 bpd
 RPCC – Potiguar Clara Refinery – Guamaré (Rio Grande do Norte) – 37 700 bpd
 LUBNOR – Lubrificantes e Derivados de Petróleo do Nordeste – Fortaleza (Ceará) – 8 000 bpd

Southeast Region 
 REGAP – Gabriel Passos Refinery – Betim (Minas Gerais) – 150.000 bpd
 REPLAN – Refinery of Paulínia – Paulínia (São Paulo) – 415 000 bpd
 REVAP – Henrique Lages Refinery – São José dos Campos (São Paulo) – 252 000 bpd
 RPBC – Presidente Bernardes Refinery - Cubatão (São Paulo) – 178 000 bpd
 RECAP – Refinery of Capuava – Mauá (São Paulo) – 53 000 bpd
 REDUC – Refinery of Duque de Caxias – Duque de Caxias (Rio de Janeiro) – 239 000 bpd
 COMPERJ (Renamed GASLUB) – Itaboraí (Rio de Janeiro) – UNDER CONSTRUCTION

South Region 
 REPAR – Presidente Getúlio Vargas Refinery – Araucária (Paraná) – 207 563 bpd
 REFAP – Alberto Pasqualini Refinery – Canoas (Rio Grande do Sul) – 201 280 bpd

Production
In 1961, Petrobras geologist Walter K. Link published Link's memorandum, which implied that the company was better off exploring offshore instead of onshore.

The company's growth was halted by the 1973 oil crisis. The entire country was affected, and the "Brazilian miracle", a period when annual GDP growth exceeded 10%, ended. Petrobras nearly went bankrupt.
In 1974, the company discovered an oil field in the Campos Basin. This discovery boosted its finances and helped it restructure nationwide. In 1975, the Brazilian Government temporarily allowed foreign operators into Brazil, and Petrobras signed exploration contracts with foreign companies for oilfields in Brazil.

The company was affected by the 1979 energy crisis, although not nearly as badly as in 1973.

The company also executed agreements with other Latin American governments and began operations outside Brazil.

In 2003, on its 50th anniversary, Petrobras surpassed  of daily production. On 1 May 2006, after the Bolivian gas conflict, Bolivia's president Evo Morales announced the nationalization of all gas and oil fields in the country and ordered the occupation of all fields by the Bolivian Army. On 4 May 2006, Petrobras cancelled a major future investment plan in Bolivia as a result. The Bolivian government demanded an increase in royalty payments from foreign petroleum companies to 82%, but eventually settled for a 50% royalty interest.

In 2007, Petrobras inaugurated the Petrobras 52 Oil Platform. The 52 is the biggest Brazilian oil platform and the third-biggest in the world.

In 2007 and 2008, Petrobras made several major oil discoveries including the Tupi oil field (formerly known as the Lula oil field), the Jupiter field, and the Sugar Loaf field, all in the Santos Basin, 300 km off the coast of Rio de Janeiro. The oil fields were discovered by partnerships that include Petrobras, Royal Dutch Shell, and Galp Energia. However, estimates for the reserves of these new fields varied widely.

The P-51 Platform, the first semisubmersible platform built entirely in Brazil, capable of producing up to 180,000 barrels of oil per day, started production in the Campos Basin in January 2009, and in February 2009, China agreed to loan Petrobras US$10 billion in exchange for a supply of 60,000-100,000 barrels of oil per day to a subsidiary of Sinopec and 40,000-60,000 barrels of oil per day to PetroChina. In August 2009, Petrobras acquired ExxonMobil's Esso assets in Chile for US$400 million.

In September 2010, Petrobras completed a US$70 billion share offering, the largest share offering in history, to be used to develop newly discovered oil fields. Giovanni Biscardi and Machado Meyer represented Petrobras. Biscardi brought his Brazilian corporate practice to Greenberg Traurig in January 2020.

In 2012, Petrobras surrendered permits to explore offshore in New Zealand. Petrobras did not provide a reason but the New Zealand Prime Minister John Key said the decision was "not a reflection on the capacity to undertake deep-sea drilling or the prospect of activity of that area". He attributed the decision to a regrouping by the company after some setbacks.

In July 2013, a worker strike action shut down production at several of the company's oil platforms. In September 2013, Petrobras sold eleven onshore exploration and production blocks in Colombia to Perenco for US$380 million.

In September 2013 Organizações Globo reported on national television that the US National Security Agency (NSA) had been spying on Petrobras. The information was based on a top secret NSA file provided to Guardian journalist Glenn Greenwald by Edward Snowden as part of the Global surveillance disclosures. The file showed that Petrobras was one of several targets for the NSA's Blackpearl program, which extricates data from private networks. Petrobras announced that it was investing R$21 billion over five years to improve its data security.

In 2014, the company sold its assets in Peru to PetroChina for US$2.6 billion.

In January 2017, the company concluded the sale of 100 percent of Petrobras Chile Distribuición Ltda (PCD) to the Southern Cross Group. The transaction included the licensing of the Petrobras and Lubrax brands for 8 years. To operate the assets acquired from Petrobras in Chile, Southern Cross created Esmax, a company that acts as a Petrobras licensee in the fuel and lubricant distribution segments. In March 2019, the company concluded the sale of 100 percent of Petrobras Paraguay Distribución Limited (PPDL UK), Petrobras Paraguay Operaciones y Logística SRL (PPOL) and Petrobras Paraguay Gas SRL (PPG) to the Grupo Copetrol, through its subsidiary Paraguay Energy. The agreement  provides for the licensing for the exclusive use of the Petrobras brand by Nextar (the successor of Petrobras Paraguay Operaciones y Logística SRL) at that country’s service stations, for the initial term of five years. In February 2021, the company concluded the sale of entire stake in Petrobras Uruguay Distribución S.A. (PUDSA), by indirect subsidiary (Petrobras Uruguay Sociedad Anónima de Inversión -PUSAI), in Uruguay, to Mauruguay S.A., an indirect wholly-owned subsidiary of Disa Corporación Petrolífera S.A. (DISA).

In January 2020, Petroleo Brasileiro stated that it ended all of its business in Africa after completing the sale of a 50% stake in Petrobras Oil & Gas BV.

Corporate affairs

Ownership
The Brazilian government directly owns 54% of Petrobras' common shares with voting rights, while the Brazilian Development Bank and Brazil's Sovereign Wealth Fund (Fundo Soberano) each control 5%, bringing the State's direct and indirect ownership to 64%. The privately held shares are traded on B3, where they are part of the Ibovespa index. It is also listed in the New York Stock Exchange in the form of American depositary receipts and in the Madrid Stock Exchange.

Social responsibility
Petrobras is a major supporter of the arts in Brazil.

Operation Car Wash and related protests in Brazil

Operation Car Wash was a criminal investigation by the Federal Police of Brazil's Curitiba branch. Originally a money laundering investigation, it expanded to cover allegations of corruption at Petrobras, where executives allegedly accepted bribes in return for awarding contracts to construction firms at inflated prices.

The authorities issued over a thousand warrants against business figures and politicians. It also led to a wave of arrests. Fernando Soares, also known as "Fernando Baiano," a businessman and lobbyist, was allegedly the connection between major Brazilian construction firms and the government formed by the Workers’ Party(PT) and Brazilian Democratic Movement (PMDB). Between 2014 and February 2016, the Federal Public Prosecutor's Office filed 37 criminal charges against 179 people, mostly politicians and businessmen. Former President Luiz Inácio Lula da Silva and then President Dilma Rousseff were also implicated.

On 8 March 2016, Marcelo Odebrecht, CEO of Odebrecht and grandson of the company's founder, was sentenced to 19 years in prison after being convicted of paying more than $30 million in bribes to Petrobras executives. Eduardo Cunha, president of the Chamber of Deputies from 2015 to 2016, was convicted of taking approximately $40 million in bribes and hiding funds in secret bank accounts and sentenced to 15 years in prison.

Protests broke out calling for the resignation or impeachment of President Rousseff. The most widespread of these occurred on 13 March 2016 in over 300 municipalities. Police estimates gave about 3.5 million protestors throughout the country. Some of the protests were in areas previously thought of as strongholds of the Workers Party, of which Rousseff was the leader.

The Bill and Melinda Gates Foundation sued Petrobras and its auditors, PriceWaterhouseCoopers as a result of the corruption scandal. In January 2018, Petrobras agreed to pay $2.95 billion to settle a U.S. class action corruption lawsuit. Later in September 2018, Petrobras agreed to pay $853.2 million to settle with Brazilian and U.S. authorities. Petrobras settled with shareholder Vanguard Group in June 2017.

On 1 February 2023 The company  informs that received the amount of R $ 132 million, as victim-beneficiary of the award-winning collaboration agreement signed between the Federal Prosecutor's Office and Rogério Santos de Araújo, before the Supreme Court.

Environmental record

Petrobras's website notes several initiatives to preserve the environment. These include efforts to support both ocean and forest ecosystems. Most notably, Petrobras has sponsored population studies and conservation efforts for humpback whales in northeast Brazil. The company's efforts helped to rebuild Brazil's humpback whale populations from 2,000 in the mid-nineties to over 9,000 in 2008.

Petrobras subscribes to the United Nations Global Compact, a voluntary agreement regarding human rights, working conditions, corruption, and the environment.

In 2008, the Spanish consultancy firm Management and Excellence named Petrobras the world's most sustainable oil company.

Oil spills

Sponsorships and namesakes

 In the Speed Racer live-action movie, one of the cars featured is the "Green Energy", a biodiesel-fueled racing car sponsored by Petrobras.
 Petrobras sponsored the Brazilian Série A from 2009 to 2012.
 Petrobras was a secondary sponsor for the AT&T Williams F1 Team from 1998 to 2008 and signed again with Williams F1 from 2014 onwards. From 2018, Petrobras left Williams and sponsored McLaren, but cancelled their sponsorship at the end of 2019.
 Petrobras sponsored the Clube de Regatas do Flamengo in Brazil from 1984 to 2009, Racing Club de Avellaneda from 2002 to 2006, Club Atlético River Plate in Argentina from 2006 to 2012 and Universidad de Chile in Chile from 2019 to 2021.
 The sauropod dinosaur Petrobrasaurus is named after the company.
Petrobras sponsored the game Copa Petrobras de Marcas, an unfinished version of Stock Car Extreme by Reiza Studios, the creators of the Automobilista series.

See also

History of Brazil (1945–1964)
Eletrobras
H-Bio
Ethanol fuel in Brazil
List of scandals in Brazil
Petrobras 36 Oil Platform
Petrosix
Transpetro
Tupi oil field
Walter K. Link
Brazil- China Relations
Urucu Oil Province

References

External links

Petrobras' News Agency
Petrobras Magazine

 
Oil and gas companies of Brazil
Bra
Government-owned companies of Brazil
Natural gas pipeline companies
Oil shale companies
Automotive fuel retailers
Biodiesel producers
Energy companies established in 1953
Non-renewable resource companies established in 1953
1953 establishments in Brazil
Multinational companies headquartered in Brazil
Companies listed on the New York Stock Exchange
Companies listed on B3 (stock exchange)
Companies listed on the Madrid Stock Exchange
Brazilian brands
Vaza Jato